The Modern Sinner Nervous Man is an EP album by the Constantines.  It was released April 16, 2002 on the Suicide Squeeze record label.

Track listing
 "Dirty Business" – 3:28
 "Underneath the Stop Sign" – 4:47
 "Blind Luck" – 3:43
artwork done by Peter Gazendam

References

External links
SuicideSqueeze.net

Suicide Squeeze Records albums
Constantines albums
2002 debut EPs